The Enigma of the Folies-Bergere (French: Enigme aux Folies-Bergère) is a 1959 French crime film directed by Jean Mitry and starring Bella Darvi, Frank Villard and Dora Doll. The police investigate a series of murders at the Folies-Bergère.

Cast
 Bella Darvi as Solange
 Frank Villard as Le commissaire Raffin
 Dora Doll as Clara
 Armand Mestral as Armand, le chauffeur
 Linda Roméo as une danseuse
 Jean Tissier as Le régisseur
 René Novan as L'inspecteur
 Maximilienne as Mme Rosenthal
 Marcel Pérès
 Charles Lemontier as Courvoisier
 Liliane Robin as Dora

References

Bibliography
 Philippe Rège. Encyclopedia of French Film Directors, Volume 1. Scarecrow Press, 2009.

External links
 

1959 films
1959 crime films
French crime films
1950s French-language films
Films directed by Jean Mitry
Films set in Paris
1950s French films